Neomorphus is a genus of terrestrial cuckoos in the family Cuculidae. Despite their relatively large size, they are highly inconspicuous and rarely seen. They are restricted to the humid primary forests in the Neotropics, and despite their similar looks, not closely related to the Asian ground cuckoos of the genus Carpococcyx.

Species

References
 Haffer, J. 1977. A Systematic Review of the Neotropical Ground Cuckoos (Aves, Neomorphus). The Bonn Zoological Bulletin 28 (1,2):48-76.
Payne, R. B. 1997. Neomorphus. pp. 606–607 in: del Hoyo, J., Elliott, A., and Sargatal, J. eds. 1997. Handbook of the Birds of the World. Vol. 4. Sandgrouse to Cuckoos. Lynx Edicions, Barcelona. 

 
Bird genera
Taxonomy articles created by Polbot